Diandongosuchus is an extinct genus of archosauriform reptile, possibly a member of the Phytosauria, known from the Middle Triassic of China. The type species Diandongosuchus fuyuanensis was named in 2012 from the Zhuganpo Formation of Yunnan Province. It is a marine species that shows similarities with another Chinese Triassic species called Qianosuchus mixtus, although it has fewer adaptations toward marine life. It was originally classified as the basal-most member of the pseudosuchian clade Poposauroidea. However, a subsequent study conducted by Stocker et al. (2016, 2017) indicated it to be the basalmost known phytosaur instead.

Description
 
Diandongosuchus is known from a nearly complete articulated skeleton (ZMNH M8770) missing most of the tail. The specimen is preserved on its right side, with the underside of the lower jaws and the trunk showing. It was prepared out of a limestone slab to reveal details on the left side of the skeleton, many of which are better preserved. The skull of Diandongosuchus is pointed, with oval-shaped eye sockets, antorbital and temporal openings. Distinctive features include a long premaxilla bone at the tip of the snout that extends backward past the nostril openings, a large ridge on the jugal bone that runs beneath the eye socket, and two supratemporal openings on the skull table that have prominent ridges surrounding them. The skull has similar proportions to that of Qianosuchus, and has the same number of teeth in the premaxilla. Like the terrestrial poposauroid Poposaurus, Diandongosuchus has a maxilla (upper jaw) bone that does not reach the border of the nostril opening.

ZMNH M8770 has 25 vertebrae in the back and neck, two sacral vertebrae (as in most Triassic pseudosuchians), and seven of the forward-most tail vertebrae. The neck vertebrae are taller and narrower than they are in Qianosuchus. Most of the back vertebrae are obscured by overlying ribs. At the back of the trunk near the hips are bones belonging to small vertebrates such as fish - likely the stomach contents of the individual. Small overlapping osteoderms (bony scutes) overlay many of the vertebrae. Two rows run along the neck, back, and tail with about two osteoderms overlaying each vertebra. Small osteoderms also cover the limb bones.

Some features of the limbs, pelvic and pectoral girdles are also diagnostic in Diandongosuchus, including a thick ischium bone in the hip, an opening of the coracoid bone in the pectoral girdle that is much larger than those of other archosaurs and is closed by the end of the scapula, and a fourth metatarsal bone in the foot that is longer than the other metatarsals. The scapula of Diandongosuchus is longer and narrower than that of Qianosuchus. The iliac blade of the hip is unusual in that it is narrow and projects far back from the rest of the hip. As in Qianosuchus, the femur of Diandongosuchus is slightly twisted, but the fibula is thinner and more curved. The astragalus and calcaneum bones of the ankle fit together like a ball-and-socket, a feature that confirms Diandongosuchus as a pseudosuchian. Some of the phalanges or toe bones are missing in ZMNH M8770, but the metatarsals are present and have unique proportions among Triassic archosaurs in which the fourth is longer than the third.

Classification

A phylogenetic analysis conducted by Li et al. (2012) in the original description of Diandongosuchus showed that it was the most basal member of a clade called Poposauroidea, which includes mostly terrestrial pseudosuchians such as the bipedal Poposaurus and the sail-backed Arizonasaurus. It was found to be closely related to Qianosuchus, an aquatic pseudosuchian that was the second most basal member of Poposauroidea. The data matrix of Li et al., a list of characteristics that was used in the analysis, was based on that of Nesbitt (2011), one of the most extensive on archosaurs. Because of this, many of the relationships found by Li et al. are the same as those found by Nesbitt. Below is a cladogram from the analysis:

However, more recent studies have found it to be a basal phytosaur.

Paleoecology
 
Diandongosuchus was found in a Ladinian-age marine limestone formation that has preserved many marine reptiles including thallatosaurs, nothosaurs, pistosaurs, and some protorosaurs. However, Diandongosuchus  shows no features that are clear adaptations to a marine lifestyle. Possible adaptations include nostrils that are positioned slightly farther back on the skull than most terrestrial pseudosuchians and a greater number of premaxillary teeth (a feature seen in possible semiaquatic archosaurs such as Chanaresuchus and spinosaurids). Fish bones within its stomach contents are additional evidence that it was a marine archosaur. Diandongosuchus may have had a similar lifestyle to modern marine crocodylians like the saltwater crocodile that live along coastlines yet are not fully marine.

The fossil assemblage in which Diandongosuchus was found bears many similarities to that of European fossil localities such as Monte San Giorgio. Both include marine reptiles like thallatosaurs and nothosaurs and probably represented environments along the northern shorelines of the Tethys Ocean. No marine archosaurs like Diandongosuchus and Qianosuchus are known from Europe, although the pseudosuchian Ticinosuchus from Monte San Giorgio was probably adapted to life along the shorelines of the Tethys. In the analyses of Li et al. (2012) and Nesbitt (2011), Ticinosuchus is either the most basal member of a clade called Loricata which is the sister taxon of Poposauroidea, or the sister taxon of Paracrocodylomorpha which includes both Loricata and Poposauroidea. Although Ticinosuchus and Diandongosuchus were initially believed to have been very closely related basal paracrocodylomorphs, this hypothesis is invalidated if Diandongosuchus is a phytosaur as other studies have shown.

References

Phytosaurs
Middle Triassic reptiles of Asia
Triassic archosaurs
Prehistoric reptile genera